Gold Star Music: Reggaeton Hits is a compilation album released in 2005 by reggaeton artist Héctor el Father, which contains the greatest hits from previous compilations released under Gold Star Music, label of Hector. The album features guest appearances from Polaco, Yomo, Kartier, Daddy Yankee, Don Omar, Zion, Wisin & Yandel, among others.

Track listing 
 "La Envidia" – Héctor el Father and Polaco
 "Que Se Sienta" – Héctor el Father and Yomo
 "Si Te Vas (remix)" – Kartiel and Zion
 "No Hay Nadie" – Héctor el Father, Yomo, and Victor Manuelle
 "Los Cojo Bajando" – Héctor el Father, Yomo, and Polaco
 "La Que Noquea" – Héctor el Father and Ariel
 "Vacía" – Kartier
 "Aprieta" – Franco "El Gorila" and Wisin
 "Déjale Caer To' El Peso" – Héctor el Father and Yomo
 "Noche de Travesura" – Héctor el Father and Divino
 "Salvaje" – Don Omar
 "Machete" – Daddy Yankee
 "Tú Quieres Duro" – Héctor el Father
 "Mirándonos" – Héctor el Father and Zion
 "No Le Temas a Él" – Trebol Clan, Héctor & Tito
 "Gata Michu Michu" – Alexis & Fido
 "Vamos Pa' La Calle" – Héctor el Father
 "Gata Fiera" – Trebol Clan, Héctor el Father, and Joan
 "Sácala" – Héctor el Father, Don Omar, Wisin & Yandel
 "Uaa, Uaa" – Ariel "El Puro"
 "Amor Prohibido" – Trebol Clan
 "Bailando Sola" – Kartier

Chart performance

References

2005 greatest hits albums
Héctor el Father albums
Albums produced by Luny Tunes